122 is an 2019 Egyptian psychological horror film directed by Yasir Al Yasiri and written by Salah Al-Goheny, and produced by Saif Oraibi. The film is the first Egyptian movie to be shot in 4DX technology.

Plot 
In Egypt calling 122 is the equivalent of calling 911 in the US or 999 in the UK. 122 is an Egyptian film that follows the story of Nasr (Ahmed Dawood) and Umnia (Amina Khalil) who are in love, they're married as well. The problem is since they couldn't afford a proper wedding they snuck off and eloped. They are trying to keeping their marriage hidden until they can afford it. Unfortunately, Umnia has become pregnant, something even more scandalous for an unmarried woman.
In order to come up with the money quickly, Nasr returns to his shady past, agreeing to transport a package of drugs for an old associate. Umnia insists on coming along. And when their car gets hit by a bus wake up in intensive care in a hospital in the middle of nowhere. The couple faces a catastrophe inside what appears to be a hospital, and attempt to escape and run for their lives.

Release 
The movie was released in Egypt on the 2nd of January 2019, then a week later it was released worldwide. The film was a blockbuster in the Egyptian Box Office topping the box office for a month, hitting in Egypt alone 24,808,161 Egyptian Pounds  The movie marked a new record in the international distribution being the first Egyptian film to be dubbed into Hind and releasing in Pakistan 

The film then was digitally released on Netflix and was named as one of the iconic Arabic movies coming to Netflix

Cast 
 Ahmed Dawood as Nasr
 Tariq Lutfi as Dr. Nabil
 Amina Khalil as Umnia
 Ahmed Al-Fishawy as Amjad
 Mohamed Mamdouh as Emad
 Mohamed Hajazy as Mohammed
 Jehan Khalil as Samar
 Sabri Abdu Men3im as Sameeh
 Asmaa Galal as Rajaa
 Mohamed Lutfi as Policeman
 Tara Emad as Suaad
 Mahmoud Basheer as Gahfeer

References

External links 
 

2019 films
2010s psychological horror films
Egyptian horror films
2010s Arabic-language films